Xanthichthys is a genus of triggerfishes native to reef environments in the western Atlantic Ocean, Indian Ocean, and Pacific Ocean.

Species
Six recognized species are placed in this genus:

 Xanthichthys auromarginatus E. T. Bennett, 1832 (gilded triggerfish)
 Xanthichthys caeruleolineatus J. E. Randall, Matsuura & Zama, 1978 (outrigger triggerfish)
 Xanthichthys greenei Pyle & Earle, 2013 (Kiri triggerfish)
 Xanthichthys lineopunctatus Hollard, 1854 (striped triggerfish)
 Xanthichthys mento D. S. Jordan & C. H. Gilbert, 1882 (redtail triggerfish)
 Xanthichthys ringens Linnaeus, 1758 (sargassum triggerfish)

References

Balistidae
Marine fish genera
Taxa named by Johann Jakob Kaup